The Landlers or Transylvanian Landlers were Protestants (more specifically Evangelical Lutherans), who were expelled and settled from Salzkammergut area, Austria to Transylvania near Hermannstadt (present-day Sibiu) from 1734 to 1756 under Emperor Charles VI and Empress Maria Theresa in the process of the Josephine colonization. This was done so given the fact that the Austrian Empire needed to be Roman Catholic by excellence and the Landlers refused to convert to Roman Catholicism. They speak the Transylvanian Landler dialect which is a southern German dialect. During the 18th century,  4,000 Austrian Protestants were expelled to Transylvania. They are part of the Romanian Germans.

Background 

The areas from which the ancestors of the modern Transylvanian Landlers stemmed were Upper Austria, Carinthia, and Styria. Since Transylvania had been depopulated by the Turkish wars and the plague, the 634 expelled Upper Austrians were given vacant farms to work. Some of the Landlers who were deported from Carinthia in 1755 joined the Hutterites in Transylvania. Transylvania was also a very tolerant country in the past with respect to other religions or confessions as well as a prosperous land in natural resources, hence the Landlers founded the needed impetus and environment to thrive in, just like the Transylvanian Saxons did before them (see Siebenbürgenlied). In total,  4,000 Protestant Austrians were expelled and settled in southern Transylvania during the Modern Age.

The Transylvanian Landlers' German dialect is still maintained and is spoken by both those who moved to Germany as well as the few Landlers left behind in their former villages of Neppendorf, Großau, and Großpold. As in the case of other German-speaking ethnic groups in Romania, the Landler are politically represented by the Democratic Forum of Germans in Romania (FDGR/DFDR). A prominent member of the Transylvanian Landler community is Martin Bottesch who formerly served as the president of the County Council of Sibiu County between 2004 and 2012.

Gallery

See also 

 Transylvanian Saxons
 Germans of Romania

Further reading 

 Povești din folclorul germanilor din România by Roland Schenn, Corint publishing house, 2014 (in Romanian)

References

Further reading 

 Erich Buchinger: Die "Landler" in Siebenbürgen. R. Oldenburg Verlag, München, 1980
 Martin Bottesch, Franz Grieshofer, Wilfried Schabus: Die Siebenbürgischen Landler. Eine Spurensicherung., Böhlau-Verlag, Wien, 2002; 
 Dieter Knall: Aus der Heimat gedrängt – Letzte Zwangsumsiedlungen steirischer Protestanten nach Siebenbürgen unter Maria Theresia, Selbstverl. d. Histor. Landeskommission für Steiermark, Graz; 2002; 343 S.; 
 Landler, Vergessene altösterreichische Tracht in Siebenbürgen von Lore-Lotte Hassfurther (Hrsg.)

External links 

  The Siebenbürger Landler ethnic group
  The Landler in Siebenbürgen

Landler
Hungarian people of Austrian descent
Romanian people of Austrian descent
Landler
Landler
History of Upper Austria
History of Transylvania (1683–1848)
Protestantism in Romania
18th century in the Habsburg monarchy